Hass (or Haß) is a German surname. Notable people with this surname include the following:

 Amira Hass (born 1956), an Israeli journalist and author
 Eric Hass (1905–1980), an American politician and Socialist Labor party presidential candidate
 Hans Hass (1919–2013), an Austrian biologist and diving pioneer; husband of Lotte Hass
 Hedwig Haß (1902–1992), a German fencer and Olympic competitor
 Hieronymus Albrecht Hass (1689–1752), a German harpsichord maker; father of J. A. Hass
 Joel Hass (born?), an American mathematician and professor
 Johann Adolph Hass (1713–1771), a German clavichord maker; son of H. A. Hass
 Karl Hass (1912–2004), a German SS lieutenant-colonel during World War II
 Lotte Hass (1928–2015), an Austrian diver and underwater model; wife of Hans Hass
 Ludwik Hass (1918–2008), a Polish historian
 Mark Hass (born 1956), an American politician
 Mike Hass (born 1983), an American football player
 Ray Hass (born 1977), a South African born Australian swimmer
 Robert Hass (born 1941), an American Poet Laureate and translator
 Robert Bernard Hass (born 1962), an American literary critic, author, and poet
 Rudolph Hass (1892–1952), an American horticulturist, developer of the Hass avocado
 Siegfried Haß (1898–1987), a German Wehrmacht general during World War II
 Steve Hass (born 1975), an American drummer
 Walter Hass (1911–1987), an American football coach and athletic director
 Wilbert H. Hass (1906-1959), an American paleontologist
 Yvette Hass (born 1985), a Swedish fashion designer and business woman

See also
 Haas (surname)

German-language surnames